Harry Baldwin may refer to:
Harry Baldwin (cricketer) (1860–1935), English cricketer and umpire
Harry Streett Baldwin (1894–1952), U.S. Congressman
Harry Baldwin (baseball) (1900–1958), American baseball player
Harry Baldwin (footballer) (1920–2010), English football goalkeeper

See also
Henry Baldwin (disambiguation)